Logrosán is a municipality within the province of Cáceres in Extremadura, Spain. It is the capital of the administrative and commercial sub-area of Don Benito-Villanueva. Logrosán was an important and growing community in the first half of the 20th century. The area was once home to a population of over 8,000 due to its large role in the Mining industry during the 19th and 20th centuries. It is currently administered by the City Council of Logrosán.

Geography
Geographically, Logrosán is located in the south of the province of Caceres (Extremadura), at the base of Las Villuercas in the Montes de Toledo mountain range. The town sits on the base of a granite batholith called "Cerro de San Cristóbal" that surfaced in the Quaternary period. In addition to the batholith, rock formations composed of quartzites and slates sometimes emerge above the ground, creating an Appalachian-esque landscape.

The greenway of Las Vegas del Guadiana ends in this area.

Economy
Economically, Logrosán is a depressed locality, with a low level of productivity. The rent in Logrosán is far below the average for the region. The primary and tertiary sectors predominate. Farms in the region are extensive, with low profitability and little job opportunities. Major industry does not exist within this municipality. The tertiary sector in this municipality is driven by administration services, commerce, and hospitality.

In spite of this poor situation, the municipality can be considered to be the head of the region, as it provides certain services of the regional and educational administration.

Monuments
Chapel of the Virgin of Consuelo: The dome of this locally important chapel stands out because of the lanterns that it is decorated with. Inside of the chapel there is an illustration of the Virgin Mary, the spiritual head of the town. The chapel, standing at the top of a hill, offers magnificent sights of the town's royal pasture and forest of more than thirty thousand holy oaks, which reaches the nearby province of Badajoz.

Park of the Alcornocal: Known as Los Alcornocales National Park, this small forest in the western part of the region features centenary cork oaks several dozen meters tall. In the 1970s the park was turned into the principal municipal park for the local populace. Today, the park contains sports facilities, swimming pools, a children's park and a house of culture. It is a popular trip destination during the summer.

The Green Route: Because of the promotional efforts of former mayor D. Manuel González, this set of roads and natural footpaths has become one of the primary tourist attractions offered by Logrosán. The Green Route is located between local fields and pastures of Extremadura and offers views of the surrounding area.

Hill of St. Kitts: This hill has been the cradle of the town since the first logrosanos lived there thousands of years ago. There is not much research available on ancient logrosano culture, but ancient footpaths can still be found along the hill.

Other places of interest
The Helechal: The place where elderly women would wash clothing. Despite being a place of deep traditions and beauty, it is not a popular visit destination today.

The Well Be quiet: The only local monument to the region's mining past.

The train station: A homage to the improvisation and the waste of the past, and to the abandonment and the apathy of the present (fed by the lack of organization between the administrations). Today it shows a promising future with the construction of the Green Route, although the station buildings are not going to face refurbishment for the time being.

The Roman Bridge: Despite its title, the Roman bridge is not, in fact, Roman. It is a medieval era construction, and represents the historical origin of the area as a whole.

Stately houses: The town is filled with them. They are representative of the region's past social structure: workers, landowners, and nobility up to the rank of count. The majority of the houses formerly belonged to wealthy families and were built to include Artesonados (Wooden roof with decorative patterns), stone staircases, wide brokers, courts, and corrals. However, many are currently in a state of ruin due to neglect.

Costanza mine: This mine is part of the Minas de Logrosán project, which restores former mines so that the public can learn about the mining heritage of the area, which has been active since prehistoric times.

Notable people
 Mario Roso de Luna, theosophist and atheneites.
 Martín del Barco Centenera, poet and chronicler of the American conquest.

References

External links
 More information about Logrosán
 Long list of (interesting) municipalities in Spain, including Logrosán

Municipalities in the Province of Cáceres